Krzyżanowski (feminine Krzyżanowska) is a Polish surname. Notable persons with that name include:
 Adam Krzyżanowski, Polish economist, former director of the Polish Academy of Learning
 Adrian Krzyżanowski (1788–1852), Polish mathematician
 Aleksander Krzyżanowski (1895–1951), Polish military officer
 Anton Krzyzanowski (born 1995), Russian intersex activist and sound designer
 Halina Krzyżanowska (1860–1937), Polish composer
 Konrad Krzyżanowski (1872–1922), Polish painter
 Olga Krzyżanowska (1929–2018), Polish politician
 Rudolf Krzyzanowski (1859–1911), Austrian composer, pupil of Anton Bruckner
 Tadeusz Krzyżanowski (1920–1987), Polish athlete
 Włodzimierz Krzyżanowski (1824–1887), Polish engineer and military leader
 Irena Sendler (1910–2008), née Krzyżanowska

See also
 
 
 Krzhizhanovsky, Russified version of the surname

Polish-language surnames